The Lille–Fontinettes railway is a French railway which runs from Lille-Flandres station to Les Fontinettes station near Calais.

Completed in 1848, it was the first railway to reach the coastal port of Calais. The Paris-Lille railway had reached Lille from Paris two years previously.

In 1993, it was bypassed by the LGV Nord high-speed line running from Lille-Europe to Calais-Fréthun and the Channel Tunnel. The main traffic today is freight and local TER Hauts-de-France passenger trains.

Railway lines in Hauts-de-France
Standard gauge railways in France
Railway lines opened in 1848